Dying to Belong is a 1997 American television film directed by William A. Graham.

Plot 
University freshman Lisa Connors has high expectations for a position at the campus newspaper. Her mother pushes her to join Pi Gamma Beta, the most prominent sorority on campus, while her first day. Her plans, however, are derailed when Shelby, a friend of hers, is killed on initiation night as a result of a typical hazing gone wrong at the same sorority. Demanding answers, Lisa tries to find answers and learns that the soroity has a secretive troubled past and how secretive and dirty the Greek system really is. 

Lisa tricks the sorority leader and another sister into going to the Bell Tower, where Lisa plays a tape recording of the other girl's account of her near death from Pi Gamma Beta's hazing.

As Lisa, her mother, and Steven walk past Greek Row, the Pi Gamma Betas are all removing their belongings, possibly because Pi Gamma Beta's charter has been terminated. Lisa's mother admits that she enjoyed being in Pi Gamma Beta because of the people, not the actual sorority. Lisa's relationship with Steven endures.

Cast
Hilary Swank as Lisa Connors
Sarah Chalke as Drea Davenport
Mark-Paul Gosselaar as Steven Tyler
Jenna von Oÿ as Shelby Blake
Laurel Holloman as Shannon
Jennifer Warren as Dean Curtis
Gregory Alan Williams as Carl Ridgeley
Tracy Middendorf as Kim Lessing
Isabella Hofmann as Gwen Connors

Reception
The film was generally negatively received. Variety called it unconvincing and spoke negatively about the cast and crew: "No one's doing much acting, and director Graham seems hung up on the premise that the telepic's serious. Swank's appealing, but the character's a blank; Gosselaar gives his role the old college try, but nothing's there. Von Oy, suggesting there could be more to her part than is apparent, doesn't find it". It continued: "Camerawork and editing are perfunctory, and Roger S. Crandal's production design's conventional. Michael Tavera's score is monotonous".

The New York Times was more approving of Swank's acting, saying that she "gives an excellent account of herself in this made-for-TV movie".

Remake 
In August 2021, a remake of the film was greenlighted by Lifetime and premiered in the fall of 2021 with Shannen Doherty, Favour Onwuka and Jenika Rose starring and Gail Harvey directing.

References

External links

1997 television films
1997 films
1997 drama films
1990s English-language films
Films about fraternities and sororities
Films directed by William Graham (director)
Films scored by Michael Tavera
Films about hazing
American drama television films
1990s American films